Gibson Lake or Lake Gibson may refer to:

Canada
Ontario
Algoma District
Gibson Lake (Aux Sables River)
Gibson Lake (Baldhead River), in Lake Superior Provincial Park
Gibson Lake (Pukaskwa River), in Pukaskwa River Provincial Park, shared with Thunder Bay District
Gibson Lake (Cochrane District)
Gibson Lake (Frontenac County)
Gibson Lake (Muskoka), in Muskoka Region
Lake Gibson (Ontario), in Niagara Region
Gibson Lake (Nipissing District)
Gibson Lake (Peel Region)
Gibson Lake (Renfrew County)
Gibson Lake (Sudbury District)
Gibson Lake (Thunder Bay District)

United States
Gibson Lake (Indiana)
Lake Gibson (Florida)

See also
Big Gibson Lake, in eastern Ontario, Canada
Little Gibson Lake, in northeastern Ontario, Canada